Emily Davis may refer to:
The Life With Derek character
The Until Dawn character